Yelkan Tedeyev (29 December 1938 – 3 October 1984) was a Soviet wrestler. He competed in the men's freestyle 63 kg at the 1968 Summer Olympics.

References

1938 births
1984 deaths
Soviet male sport wrestlers
Olympic wrestlers of the Soviet Union
Wrestlers at the 1968 Summer Olympics